is a passenger railway station located in Isogo-ku, Yokohama, Kanagawa Prefecture, Japan, operated by the East Japan Railway Company (JR East).

Lines

Station layout 
The station consists of one island platform serving two tracks. The platform is connected to the station building by an underpass. The station is staffed.

Platforms

History
The area around Yōkōdai Station  was formerly a small rural pocket within central Yokohama. It was developed into a large housing district in the early 1970s. The Japan National Railways (JNR) Keihin-Tōhoku Line was extended from its former terminus at Isogo Station, and Yōkōdai Station was opened on 17 March 1970. The line was further extended to Ōfuna Station in 1973. The station came under the management of JR East on April 1, 1987 after the privatization of the JNR.

Passenger statistics
In fiscal 2019, the station was used by an average of 20,064 passengers daily (boarding passengers only).

The passenger figures (boarding passengers only) for previous years are as shown below.

Surrounding area
 Yokohama Science Center, a municipal science museum for children, is located near the station.
 Kanagawa Prefectural Isogo High School
 Kanagawa Prefectural Yokohama Nanryo High School
 Kanagawa Prefectural Hitorizawa High School

See also
 List of railway stations in Japan

References

External links

 

Railway stations in Kanagawa Prefecture
Railway stations in Japan opened in 1970
Keihin-Tōhoku Line
Negishi Line
Railway stations in Yokohama